Adrian Romero (born 4 October 1972) is a Guamanian freestyle swimmer. He competed in four events at the 1992 Summer Olympics.

References

External links
 

1972 births
Living people
Guamanian male freestyle swimmers
Olympic swimmers of Guam
Swimmers at the 1992 Summer Olympics
Place of birth missing (living people)